Wilmer Rensink (born March 22, 1933) was an American politician in the state of Iowa.

Rensink was born in Sioux Center, Iowa. He is a farmer and livestock feeder. He served in the Iowa State Senate from 1987 to 1999, and House of Representatives from 1983 to 1987 as a Republican.

References

1931 births
Living people
People from Sioux Center, Iowa
Farmers from Iowa
Republican Party Iowa state senators
Republican Party members of the Iowa House of Representatives
20th-century American politicians